IL 5 or IL-5 may refer to:
 Interleukin 5
 Illinois's 5th congressional district
 Illinois Route 5